In mathematics and physics, a soliton or solitary wave is a self-reinforcing wave packet that maintains its shape while it propagates at a constant velocity. Solitons are caused by a cancellation of nonlinear and dispersive effects in the medium. (Dispersive effects are a property of certain systems where the speed of a wave depends on its frequency.) Solitons are the solutions of a widespread class of weakly nonlinear dispersive partial differential equations describing physical systems.

The soliton phenomenon was first described in 1834 by John Scott Russell (1808–1882) who observed a solitary wave in the Union Canal in Scotland. He reproduced the phenomenon in a wave tank and named it the "Wave of Translation".

Definition
A single, consensus definition of a soliton is difficult to find.  ascribe three properties to solitons:
 They are of permanent form;
 They are localized within a region;
 They can interact with other solitons, and emerge from the collision unchanged, except for a phase shift.

More formal definitions exist, but they require substantial mathematics. Moreover, some scientists use the term soliton for phenomena that do not quite have these three properties (for instance, the 'light bullets' of nonlinear optics are often called solitons despite losing energy during interaction).

Explanation

Dispersion and nonlinearity can interact to produce permanent and localized wave forms.  Consider a pulse of light traveling in glass. This pulse can be thought of as consisting of light of several different frequencies.  Since glass shows dispersion, these different frequencies travel at different speeds and the shape of the pulse therefore changes over time. However, also the nonlinear Kerr effect occurs; the refractive index of a material at a given frequency depends on the light's amplitude or strength. If the pulse has just the right shape, the Kerr effect exactly cancels the dispersion effect and the pulse's shape does not change over time. Thus, the pulse is a soliton. See soliton (optics) for a more detailed description.

Many exactly solvable models have soliton solutions, including the Korteweg–de Vries equation, the nonlinear Schrödinger equation, the coupled nonlinear Schrödinger equation, and the sine-Gordon equation. The soliton solutions are typically obtained by means of the inverse scattering transform, and owe their stability to the integrability of the field equations. The mathematical theory of these equations is a broad and very active field of mathematical research.

Some types of tidal bore, a wave phenomenon of a few rivers including the River Severn, are 'undular': a wavefront followed by a train of solitons. Other solitons occur as the undersea internal waves, initiated by seabed topography, that propagate on the oceanic pycnocline. Atmospheric solitons also exist, such as the morning glory cloud of the Gulf of Carpentaria, where pressure solitons traveling in a temperature inversion layer produce vast linear roll clouds. The recent and not widely accepted soliton model in neuroscience proposes to explain the signal conduction within neurons as pressure solitons.

A topological soliton, also called a topological defect, is any solution of a set of partial differential equations that is stable against decay to the "trivial solution". Soliton stability is due to topological constraints, rather than integrability of the field equations. The constraints arise almost always because the differential equations must obey a set of boundary conditions, and the boundary has a nontrivial homotopy group, preserved by the differential equations. Thus, the differential equation solutions can be classified into homotopy classes.

No continuous transformation maps a solution in one homotopy class to another. The solutions are truly distinct, and maintain their integrity, even in the face of extremely powerful forces. Examples of topological solitons include the screw dislocation in a crystalline lattice, the Dirac string and the magnetic monopole in electromagnetism, the Skyrmion and the Wess–Zumino–Witten model in quantum field theory, the magnetic skyrmion in condensed matter physics, and cosmic strings and domain walls in cosmology.

History

In 1834, John Scott Russell describes his wave of translation. The discovery is described here in Scott Russell's own words:

Scott Russell spent some time making practical and theoretical investigations of these waves. He built wave tanks at his home and noticed some key properties:
 The waves are stable, and can travel over very large distances (normal waves would tend to either flatten out, or steepen and topple over)
 The speed depends on the size of the wave, and its width on the depth of water.
 Unlike normal waves they will never merge – so a small wave is overtaken by a large one, rather than the two combining.
 If a wave is too big for the depth of water, it splits into two, one big and one small.

Scott Russell's experimental work seemed at odds with Isaac Newton's and Daniel Bernoulli's theories of hydrodynamics. George Biddell Airy and George Gabriel Stokes had difficulty accepting Scott Russell's experimental observations because they could not be explained by the existing water wave theories.  Their contemporaries spent some time attempting to extend the theory but it would take until the 1870s before Joseph Boussinesq and Lord Rayleigh published a theoretical treatment and solutions. In 1895 Diederik Korteweg and Gustav de Vries provided what is now known as the Korteweg–de Vries equation, including solitary wave and periodic cnoidal wave solutions.

In 1965 Norman Zabusky of Bell Labs and Martin Kruskal of Princeton University first demonstrated soliton behavior in media subject to the Korteweg–de Vries equation (KdV equation) in a computational investigation using a finite difference approach.  They also showed how this behavior explained the puzzling earlier work of Fermi, Pasta, Ulam, and Tsingou.

In 1967, Gardner, Greene, Kruskal and Miura discovered an inverse scattering transform enabling analytical solution of the KdV equation. The work of Peter Lax on Lax pairs and the Lax equation has since extended this to solution of many related soliton-generating systems.

Note that solitons are, by definition, unaltered in shape and speed by a collision with other solitons. So solitary waves on a water surface are near-solitons, but not exactly – after the interaction of two (colliding or overtaking) solitary waves, they have changed a bit in amplitude and an oscillatory residual is left behind.

Solitons are also studied in quantum mechanics, thanks to the fact that they could provide a new foundation of it through de Broglie's unfinished program, known as "Double solution theory" or "Nonlinear wave mechanics". This theory, developed by de Broglie in 1927 and revived in the 1950s, is the natural continuation of his ideas developed between 1923 and 1926, which extended the wave-particle duality introduced by Albert Einstein for the light quanta, to all the particles of matter. In 2019, researchers from Tel-Aviv university measured an accelerating surface gravity water wave soliton by using an external hydrodynamic linear potential. They also managed to excite ballistic solitons and measure their corresponding phases.

In fiber optics

Much experimentation has been done using solitons in fiber optics applications.  Solitons in a fiber optic system are described by the Manakov equations.
Solitons' inherent stability make long-distance transmission possible without the use of repeaters, and could potentially double transmission capacity as well.

In Arts 

Visionary american artist Paul Laffoley painted "The Solitron" (1997), in which he depicted the soliton wave as a neoalchemichal way of achieving perpetual stillness.

In biology
Solitons may occur in proteins and DNA.  Solitons are related to the low-frequency collective motion in proteins and DNA.

A recently developed model in neuroscience proposes that signals, in the form of density waves, are conducted within neurons in the form of solitons. Solitons can be described as almost lossless energy transfer in biomolecular chains or lattices as wave-like propagations of coupled conformational and electronic disturbances.

In material physics 
Solitons can occur in materials, such as ferroelectrics, in the form of domain walls. Ferroelectric materials exhibit spontaneous polarization, or electric dipoles, which are coupled to configurations of the material structure. Domains of oppositely poled polarizations can be present within a single material as the structural configurations corresponding to opposing polarizations are equally favorable with no presence of external forces. The domain boundaries, or “walls”, that separate these local structural configurations are regions of lattice dislocations. The domain walls can propagate as the polarizations, and thus, the local structural configurations can switch within a domain with applied forces such as electric bias or mechanical stress. Consequently, the domain walls can be described as solitons, discrete regions of dislocations that are able to slip or propagate and maintain their shape in width and length.  

In recent literature, ferroelectricity has been observed in twisted bilayers of van der Waal materials such as MoS2 and graphene. The moiré superlattice that arises from the relative twist angle between the van der Waal monolayers generates regions of different stacking orders of the atoms within the layers. These regions exhibit inversion symmetry breaking structural configurations that enable ferroelectricity at the interface of these monolayers. The domain walls that separate these regions are composed of partial dislocations where different types of stresses, and thus, strains are experienced by the lattice. It has been observed that soliton or domain wall propagation across a moderate length of the sample (order of nanometers to micrometers) can be initiated with applied stress from an AFM tip on a fixed region. The soliton propagation carries the mechanical perturbation with little loss in energy across the material, which enables domain switching in a domino-like fashion.

It has also been observed that the type of dislocations found at the walls can affect propagation parameters such as direction. For instance, STM measurements showed four types of strains of varying degrees of shear, compression, and tension at domain walls depending on the type of localized stacking order in twisted bilayer graphene. Different slip directions of the walls are achieved with different types of strains found at the domains, influencing the direction of the soliton network propagation.

Nonidealities such as disruptions to the soliton network and surface impurities can influence soliton propagation as well. Domain walls can meet at nodes and get effectively pinned, forming triangular domains, which have been readily observed in various ferroelectric twisted bilayer systems. In addition, closed loops of domain walls enclosing multiple polarization domains can inhibit soliton propagation and thus, switching of polarizations across it. Also, domain walls can propagate and meet at wrinkles and surface inhomogeneities within the van der Waal layers, which can act as obstacles obstructing the propagation.

In magnets 
In magnets, there also exist different types of solitons and other nonlinear waves. These magnetic solitons are an exact solution of classical nonlinear differential equations — magnetic equations, e.g. the Landau–Lifshitz equation, continuum Heisenberg model, Ishimori equation, nonlinear Schrödinger equation and others.

In nuclear physics
Atomic nuclei may exhibit solitonic behavior.  Here the whole nuclear wave function is predicted to exist as a soliton under certain conditions of temperature and energy.  Such conditions are suggested to exist in the cores of some stars in which the nuclei would not react but pass through each other unchanged, retaining their soliton waves through a collision between nuclei.

The Skyrme Model is a model of nuclei in which each nucleus is considered to be a topologically stable soliton solution of a field theory with conserved baryon number.

Bions

The bound state of two solitons is known as a bion, or in systems where the bound state periodically oscillates, a breather. The interference-type forces between solitons could be used in making bions .However, these forces are very sensitive to their relative phases. Alternatively, the bound state of solitons could be formed by dressing atoms with highly excited Rydberg levels. The resulting self-generated potential profile features an inner attractive soft-core supporting the 3D self-trapped soliton, an intermediate repulsive shell (barrier) preventing solitons’ fusion, and an outer attractive layer (well) used for completing the bound state resulting in giant stable soliton molecules. In this scheme, the distance and size of the individual solitons in the molecule can be controlled dynamically with the laser adjustment. 

In field theory bion usually refers to the solution of the Born–Infeld model. The name appears to have been coined by G. W. Gibbons in order to distinguish this solution from the conventional soliton, understood as a regular, finite-energy (and usually stable) solution of a differential equation describing some physical system. The word regular means a smooth solution carrying no sources at all. However, the solution of the Born–Infeld model still carries a source in the form of a Dirac-delta function at the origin. As a consequence it displays a singularity in this point (although the electric field is everywhere regular). In some physical contexts (for instance string theory) this feature can be important, which motivated the introduction of a special name for this class of solitons.

On the other hand, when gravity is added (i.e. when considering the coupling of the Born–Infeld model to general relativity) the corresponding solution is called EBIon, where "E" stands for Einstein.

Alcubierre drive
Erik Lentz, a physicist at the University of Göttingen, has theorized that solitons could allow for the generation of Alcubierre warp bubbles in spacetime without the need for exotic matter, i.e., matter with negative mass.

See also
 Compacton, a soliton with compact support
 Freak waves may be a Peregrine soliton related phenomenon involving breather waves which exhibit concentrated localized energy with non-linear properties.
 Nematicons
 Non-topological soliton, in quantum field theory
 Nonlinear Schrödinger equation
 Oscillons
 Pattern formation
 Peakon, a soliton with a non-differentiable peak
 Q-ball a non-topological soliton
 Sine-Gordon equation
 Soliton (optics)
 Soliton (topological)
 Soliton distribution
 Soliton hypothesis for ball lightning, by David Finkelstein
 Soliton model of nerve impulse propagation
 Topological quantum number
 Vector soliton

Notes

References

Further reading

External links

Related to John Scott Russell
John Scott Russell and the solitary wave
John Scott Russell biography 
Photograph of soliton on the Scott Russell Aqueduct 

Other
Heriot–Watt University soliton page
Helmholtz solitons, Salford University
Short didactic review on optical solitons

Fluid dynamics
Integrable systems
Partial differential equations
Quasiparticles
Solitons
Wave mechanics